The Spirit of the Beehive (often styled as SPIRIT OF THE BEEHIVE) is an American band from Philadelphia, Pennsylvania. The band name comes from 1973 Spanish film of the same name.

The band features Zack Schwartz, formerly of the band Glocca Morra. Their debut self-titled album was released in 2014. An EP entitled You Are Arrived (But You've Been Cheated), was released in 2015.  In 2017, the band released their 2nd full-length called Pleasure Suck, on Tiny Engines. Their 3rd album Hypnic Jerks, was released through Tiny Engines in 2018. Their 4th album Entertainment, Death was released on April 9, 2021, on Saddle Creek.

Members

Current members
 Zack Schwartz - lead vocals, guitar, sampler, keyboards (2014–Present)
 Rivka Ravede - lead vocals, bass, percussion (2014–Present)
 Corey Wichlin - keyboards, sampler, guitar (2019–Present), drums, vocals (2020–Present)

Former members
 Justin Fox - guitar, keyboards (2014-2016)
 Timothy Jordan - guitar, lead and backing vocals (2014-2016)
 Phil Warner - keyboards, guitar, percussion (2016-2018, touring 2022-Present)
 Derrick Brandon (DOT PONY) - keyboards, sampler, guitar, percussion (2018-2019)
 Kyle Laganella - guitar (2018–2020, touring 2021)
 Pat Conaboy - drums, percussion (2014–2020), lead and backing vocals (2014-2016), electronic drums (2018–2020)

Discography

Studio albums
 The Spirit of the Beehive (2014)
 Pleasure Suck (2017)
 Hypnic Jerks (2018)
 Entertainment, Death (2021)

Extended plays
 You Are Arrived (But You've Been Cheated) (2015)

Singles
 "Ricky (Caught Me Tryin')" (2017)
 "Cops Come Looking" (2017)
 "Twenty First Road Trip" (2017)
 "can i receive the contact?" (2018)
 "d.o.u.b.l.e.u.r.o.n.g." (2018)
 "hypnic jerks" (2018)
 "The Door Is Open" (2020)
 "THERE'S NOTHING YOU CAN'T DO" (2021)
 "THE SERVER IS IMMERSED" (2021)
 “THE DOOR IS CLOSING”  (2021)

References

Musical groups from Philadelphia
Saddle Creek Records artists
Tiny Engines artists
Ice Age Records artists